Anna Maria Rüttimann-Meyer von Schauensee (6 October 1772 in Luzern – 19 August 1856) was a politically influential Swiss salonist during the Helvetian Republic. She was married to Vinzenz Rüttimann from 1794 and corresponded with Paul Usteri from 1799.

Life
Her salon was a centre of political debate. Her influence upon contemporary Swiss policy is believed to have been great.

Sources
Evelyn Boesch, «Das angenehmste ist, an unsere Republik zu denken». Anna Maria Rüttimann zum Verhältnis von Staat und Geschlecht in der Helvetik, in: *Ernst, Andreas u.a. (Hg.), Revolution und Innovation. Die konfliktreiche Entstehung des schweizerischen Bundesstaates von 1848, Zürich 1998, S. 161–172.
Evelyn Boesch, «Ich weiss bald nicht mehr, wie ich in meinem Zimmer sitzen will». Was für die Patrizierin Anna Maria Rüttimann die helvetische Politik bedeutete, in: Mit Pfeffer und Pfiff, hg. v. Verein Frauenstadtrundgang Luzern 1998, S. 46–59.
Evelyn Boesch, Mit Überzeugung und Hingabe. Republikanische Frauen und Männer erleben die Helvetik, in: Baur, Brigitte u.a. (Hg.), «Welch ein Leben». Quellentexte zum gesellschaftlichen Umbruch in der Innerschweiz nach 1798, Zürich 1998, S. 47–108.
Esther Nünlist, Helvetische Revolution und «Weiber Instinkt». Der politische Einfluss der Republikanerin Anna Maria Rüttimann, Saarbrücken 2010, .

1772 births
1856 deaths
19th-century Swiss people
Swiss salon-holders
19th-century Swiss women